Elton Mac Huddleston Jr. (born September 16, 1943) is a Republican member of the Mississippi House of Representatives, representing the 15th district since 2008.

Early life and education 
Huddleston graduated from the Auburn University College of Veterinary Medicine in 1972.

Vietnam war veteran 
Huddleston served with the 9th Division as a lieutenant in the Mekong River Delta during the Vietnam War, operating a UH-1 Iroquois (Huey) helicopter.

Current committee assignments
 Appropriations – Vice-chair
 Agriculture
 Apportionment and Elections
 Congressional Redistricting
 Ethics
 Legislative Reapportionment
 Military Affairs
 Public Health and Human Services
 Rules
 Universities and Colleges

Personal 
Huddleston is married to the former Flavia Hutchinson, and he is a practicing Baptist.

References

External links
 Mac Huddleston at Mississippi House of Representatives
 Mac Huddleston at Vote Smart
 Mac Huddleston at Ballotpedia

1943 births
Living people
Republican Party members of the Mississippi House of Representatives
Mississippi State University alumni
Auburn University alumni
21st-century American politicians